Sybille may refer to:

François Sybille (1906–1968), Belgian boxer 
Princess Elisabeth Sybille of Saxe-Weimar-Eisenach (1854–1908), the first wife of Duke Johann Albrecht of Mecklenburg
Sybille Bammer (born 1980), Austrian tennis player 
Sybille Bedford (1911–2006), German-born English writer
Sybille Binder (1895–1962), Austrian actress of Jewish descent
Sybille Bödecker (born 1948), East German slalom canoeist 
Sybille de Selys Longchamps (born 1941), Belgian aristocrat
Sybille Gruner (born 1969), German handball player
Sybille of Bâgé (1255–1294), Countess Consort of Savoy
Sybille of Cleves (Sibylle von Jülich-Kleve-Berg) (1512–1554), Electress consort of Saxony
Sybille Pearson (born 1937), Czech playwright, musical theatre lyricist and librettist 
Sybille Reinhardt (born 1957), German rower
Sybille Schönrock (born 1964), German swimmer
Sybille Schmidt (born 1967), German rower
Sybille Schmitz (1909–1955), German actress
Sybille Spindler, East German slalom canoeist
Sybille Waury (born 1970), German actress

See also
Meine Freundin Sybille, East German film
Sibyl (disambiguation)

German feminine given names

de:Sybille
fr:Sybille